Davis Javier Romero (born March 30, 1983) is a Panamanian former professional baseball pitcher who is currently free agent. He has played in Major League Baseball (MLB) for the Toronto Blue Jays.

Career
Davis made his Major League debut on August 18, 2006 against the Baltimore Orioles, pitching 2.2 innings, allowing one hit, no runs, no walks, and getting two strikeouts. He appeared six more times during the 2006 season, getting a win in a September 20, 2006 game against the New York Yankees, getting one strikeout and giving up three hits, one walk, and one run.

Romero had season ending surgery in March 2007 and did not pitch that year.

After the 2020 season, he played for Panama in the 2021 Caribbean Series.

International career
Romero was selected to represent Panama at the 2023 World Baseball Classic qualification.

References

External links

1983 births
Living people
Auburn Doubledays players
Charleston AlleyCats players
Dunedin Blue Jays players
Las Vegas 51s players
Major League Baseball pitchers
Major League Baseball players from Panama
Medicine Hat Blue Jays players
National baseball team players
New Hampshire Fisher Cats players
Panamanian expatriate baseball players in Canada
Panamanian expatriate baseball players in the United States
People from Aguadulce District
Syracuse SkyChiefs players
Toronto Blue Jays players
2006 World Baseball Classic players
2023 World Baseball Classic players